Sparganothina setosa is a species of moth of the family Tortricidae. It is found in Guerrero, Mexico.

The length of the forewings is about 8 mm. The forewings are golden yellow with dark brown markings. The hindwings are white, without pattern.

Etymology
The species name refers to the presence of setae on the uncus dorsally and is derived from Latin setosus (meaning bristly).

References

Moths described in 2001
Sparganothini